The United States Formula Three Championship was a short-lived Formula Three championship contested in the United States and Canada.  Sanctioned by the Sports Car Club of America, the series lasted for two seasons, 2000 and 2001.  All teams used Volkswagen engines tuned by Bertils Racing Engines.

The series was plagued by low car counts; no more than 6 cars contested races in the inaugural season. In 2001, fields were bolstered by Formula Ford, Formula Continental, and even Sports 2000 and historic Formula 5000 cars, as no race had more than 3 Formula Three cars on the grid.  14 of the series' 19 races were won by Brazilian driver Luciano Gomide.  A 2002 season was planned with 13 races, including a doubleheader supporting the 2002 United States Grand Prix, but was ultimately cancelled.

2000 season
The 2000 season was contested over 11 races at 6 race meetings.  The schedule initially included two oval races at Indianapolis Raceway Park and Irwindale Speedway, but these were later cancelled.  The round at San Diego was a joint race with the Mexican Formula Three Championship, although the Mexican series ran with older, slower machinery.  Stuart Crow won the championship by 5 points over Luciano Gomide.  Gomide joined the series after the first 4 rounds, and won pole and the race at the final 7 events on the calendar.

Schedule and results

Points standings

One bonus point was also awarded to the driver completing the fastest lap during the race.

2001 season
An initial 13-race calendar was announced for the 2001 season, however after losing their financial backing, the series was re-arranged to a 15-race schedule with the addition of more rounds in Canada.  With low car counts eminent, the series considered using Formula Super Vee cars as a "Class B", but instead Formula Ford and Formula Continental cars filled out fields.  No more than three Formula 3 cars participated in any race; five of the nine races were contested only by the EuroInternational teammates Luciano Gomide and John C. Antonio.  Gomide won all but one race and took the championship title.

Initial schedule

Schedule and results

Points standings

See also

 Formula Three
 Formula Lites
 F3 Americas Championship

References

 
2000 establishments in the United States
2001 disestablishments in the United States
Formula Three series
Defunct auto racing series
Defunct sports competitions in the United States